"Black Sweat" is a song by Prince that was released as the second single from his 2006 album 3121. The music video to accompany the single was released on February 2, 2006. At the 49th Annual Grammy Awards, it was nominated for Best R&B Song and Best Male R&B Vocal Performance.

Music video
The video is presented in black and white.  It features dancer Celestina Aladekoba and was directed by Sanaa Hamri.

Official versions
Original
Video version
TSMV edit by Tommie Sunshine

Chart performance
For the week ending March 11, 2006, "Black Sweat" debuted on the Billboard Hot 100 at number 60 (Prince's highest debut since "The Greatest Romance Ever Sold" in 1999), and at number 83 on the Hot R&B/Hip-Hop Singles and Tracks chart. It also debuted at number one on Billboards Hot 100 Singles Sales chart, which tabulates both physical and digital sales.

The song's initial surge of 11,500 digital singles sales was prompted by a month-long promotion with iTunes, in which four consumers would win a private concert performance by Prince. "Black Sweat" was bundled with a second track from 3121, Beautiful, Loved and Blessed (duet with Támar. This promotional tactic propelled the song's lofty Hot 100 debut. As is typical with songs whose chart position is predominantly attributed to initial sales (with little or no radio airplay), "Black Sweat" dropped off the Hot 100 the following week.
"Black Sweat" debuted at number two on the Canadian Singles Chart for sales. The track was released on March 27, 2006 in the UK, and charted relatively low at number 43 on the UK Singles Chart, meaning Prince did not have a top 40 hit since the re-release of "1999" in the year 1998 during his lifetime. In Italy the single peaked at number 24.

Overall, "Black Sweat" appeared on the pop charts in a number of countries in 2006, including the US, and went Top 40 on the charts in Greece, Italy, Latvia, Netherlands, and Spain. In addition, the song was a hit on Japanese radio, staying at high rotation for several weeks on stations throughout the country.

Charts

References

2005 songs
2006 singles
Prince (musician) songs
NPG Records singles
Song recordings produced by Prince (musician)
Songs written by Prince (musician)
Music videos directed by Sanaa Hamri
Black-and-white music videos
Universal Music Group singles